The Nanded–Visakhapatnam Express (previously Nizamabad–Visakhapatnam Express) is an Express Train service connecting the cities of Nanded, Maharashtra and Visakhapatnam in the Indian state of Andhra Pradesh. It is jointly operated by the South Central Railway and South Coast Railway zones of the Indian Railways. This is a non-daily service which runs on Tuesdays, Wednesdays and Saturdays. The train number 20811 runs from Visakhapatnam to Nanded and the train 20812 runs from Nanded to Visakhapatnam on Sundays, Wednesdays and Thursdays.

Composition 

NED–VSKP Express consists of 23 coaches with 1 locomotive
 1 x AC II coach
 3 x AC III coach
 10 x III tier Sleeper
 6 x General/Unreserved
 2 x SLR
1 x Pantry Car

The coaches are commissioned from the VSKP coaching depot.

This train also shares the rake with Hirakud Express.

Stoppage  
This train stops at Mudkhed Jn, Basar, Nizamabad Jn, Kamareddi, Secunderabad Jn, Kazipet Jn, Rayanapadu, Eluru, Tadepalligudem, Rajahmundry and Duvvada.

Locomotive 
The train is hauled between Nanded and Secunderabad Jn by twin WDM-3A or WDM-3D locomotives from the Guntakal shed or WDP-4 locomotive of Gooty shed. Between Secunderabad and Visakhapatnam it is hauled by a single WAP-4 locomotive of Lallaguda shed or WAG-5 of Vijayawada shed.

See also
 Rail transport in India
 South Central Railway zone
 Andhra Pradesh Sampark Kranti Express

References

External links
 Running status
 Running status

Rail transport in Andhra Pradesh
Rail transport in Maharashtra
Rail transport in Telangana
Express trains in India
Transport in Visakhapatnam
Transport in Nanded